Kaisa Kella is a Finnish former competitive figure skater. She is a three-time Nordic champion and a two-time Finnish national champion. Kella placed 11th at the 1992 World Junior Championships and 21st at the 1993 European Championships.

Competitive highlights

References 

Finnish female single skaters
Living people
Year of birth missing (living people)
20th-century Finnish women